Pamphila may refer to:
Pamphile of Epidaurus, Ancient Greek historian
Pamphila (genus), formerly-recognised genus of butterfly